Kung Lao ( or ) is a fictional character in the Mortal Kombat fighting game franchise by Midway Games and NetherRealm Studios. A Shaolin monk, he debuted in Mortal Kombat II (1993). He is depicted as a primary hero in the series, including as one of the protagonists of the action-adventure spin-off Mortal Kombat: Shaolin Monks (2005). The character is also a descendant of the Great Kung Lao, the first Earthrealm champion of the Mortal Kombat tournament. His main weapon is a metal hat, which he uses for both melee and projectile attacks.

Outside of the games, Kung Lao has appeared in various related media. Reception to the character has been generally positive, particularly in respect to his appearance, special abilities, and Fatality finishing moves.

Appearances

Mortal Kombat games
Introduced in Mortal Kombat II (1993), Kung Lao is one of the last known descendants of the Great Kung Lao, a Mortal Kombat champion who lost the title and his life to the Shokan Prince Goro 500 years previously, resulting in the start of corrupt sorcerer Shang Tsung's rule over the tournament. Kung Lao was originally chosen to represent the Shaolin in the Mortal Kombat tournament, but he declined due to the consequences of becoming champion. As a result, his friend Liu Kang was chosen and emerged as the winner. When a portal leading to the otherworldly dimension Outworld is opened and the Shaolin temple is attacked by Baraka and his Tarkatan soldiers, Liu Kang and Kung Lao resolve to travel through the portal themselves and avenge their fallen Shaolin brothers. Kung Lao's ultimate goal however was to rebuild the White Lotus Society at the Wu Shi Academy in order to train a new generation of warriors for the coming ages. Following Liu Kang's victory over the Outworld tyrant Shao Kahn, the monks return to Earth and begin training the next generation of Shaolin warriors.

When Shao Kahn invades Earthrealm in Mortal Kombat 3 (1995), Kung Lao temporarily scraps his plans for reforming the White Lotus Society. While he faces the Kahn in battle, he is ultimately defeated and presumed dead. Enraged by his friend's apparent death, Liu Kang challenges Shao Kahn and defeats him a second time.

With Outworld driven back during Mortal Kombat Gold (1999), Kung Lao decides not to return to the Shaolin; allowing everyone to believe that he was dead so he can live a life of peace in respect to the beliefs of his ancestors. This would not last long however, as he is drawn away from his newfound peace to help fight against the fallen Elder God Shinnok's forces when word reaches him that Goro is still alive. After Shinnok's defeat, Kung Lao attacks Goro with a ceremonial strike of vengeance for the Great Kung Lao's death. With this act, the two warriors shake hands, ending their conflict.

After enjoying peace for a few years, when Shang Tsung allied himself with fellow sorcerer Quan Chi to murder Liu Kang during the events of Mortal Kombat: Deadly Alliance (2002), Kung Lao finds his corpse. After the thunder god Raiden brings him up to speed on what happened, an enraged Kung Lao vows revenge; abandoning his pacifist Shaolin beliefs once more. However, he believes his current skills were insufficient to defeat the Deadly Alliance after meeting with several other Earthrealm warriors and traveling to Outworld. Along the way, Kung Lao seeks out advice and training from Outworld martial arts teacher Bo' Rai Cho.

However, this would not be enough, as Kung Lao and most of his allies fell to the Deadly Alliance before they were resurrected by the dragon king Onaga to become his slaves during the events of Mortal Kombat: Deception (2004). He and the rest of his brainwashed allies were later released from Onaga's spell by a partially resurrected Liu Kang and reformed ninja Ermac.

In the action-adventure game Mortal Kombat: Shaolin Monks (2005), an alternate depiction of the events between the first and second Mortal Kombat games, Kung Lao's character was explored to a greater degree than had been shown in previous titles. In this game, he is portrayed as feeling almost resentful of Liu Kang's victory in the Shaolin tournament. Though they are shown to be friends, Kung Lao constantly baits his fellow Shaolin monk, especially regarding Princess Kitana, and the tournament that Shang Tsung disguised as Raiden has sent them to compete in. A rivalry between the two monks was hence established for the first time. As the two fighters defeated Shang Tsung's warriors, they formed a race of sorts to become the Mortal Kombat champion. Kung Lao, especially, took time to gloat about how he will win. This rivalry escalated until the two warriors become convinced that the other has been corrupted by Outworld.

The wind god Fujin's bio for Mortal Kombat: Armageddon (2006) describes Kung Lao as having joined forces with him to bring their former comrades Raiden and Liu Kang under control, with the God of Thunder becoming "as ruthless as Shao Kahn" and Liu Kang's corpse selectively slaying various people. Fujin then goes on to state in his bio that if no solution was found to revert the two corrupted warriors back to normal, both he and Kung Lao would be forced to finish them. During the course of the game, Kung Lao kills Baraka in battle, but is slain by a clone of Shinnok.

In the rebooted continuity of Mortal Kombat (2011), Raiden receives foreboding visions from his future self and attempts to change the timeline of events that lead to Armageddon. He allows Kung Lao to fight in the second tournament. Kung Lao defeats Shang Tsung, Quan Chi, and the Shokan Kintaro, but he is killed by Shao Kahn. This enrages Liu Kang, who mortally wounds the tyrant in retaliation. Following Shao Kahn's failed invasion of Earthrealm, Kung Lao is resurrected as one of Quan Chi's undead revenant slaves. Kung Lao's non-canonical ending shows him at his ancestor's burial site with Raiden, where he is given a vision of the past that reveals he is the reincarnation of the Great Kung Lao.

Kung Lao returns in Mortal Kombat X (2015), continuing to serve Quan Chi and Shinnok in the Netherrealm. His younger cousin, Kung Jin, appears in the story as a thief turned Shaolin archer and member of the Special Forces after his family fell on hard times following Kung Lao's death.

In Mortal Kombat 11 (2019), past iterations of Kung Lao and Liu Kang are brought to the present due to the machinations of the keeper of time Kronika. After learning the Shaolin Temple was attacked by Kronika's forces, the Shaolin monks head out to investigate, only to encounter their revenant selves and fail to stop Kronika's henchman Geras from stealing vials of Earth's lifeforce. They later help Kitana defeat Shao Kahn and lead the surviving Shaolin monks alongside the combined Earthrealm/Outworld armies in assaulting Kronika's Keep while their revenants attempt to stop them. In his non-canonical arcade ending, Kung Lao uses Kronika's Hourglass to save the Great Kung Lao from his defeat at Goro's hands. Within years, the Great Kung Lao became the undisputed Mortal Kombat champion. Millions of people later join the White Lotus Society and inspire rebels to mutiny against Shao Kahn, bringing peace to the realms. By the time Onaga awakens, he is no match for Kung Lao's power.

Character design and gameplay
As stated in Kung Lao's bio card that after the first Mortal Kombat game, the creators wanted a monk character other than Liu Kang. According to Mortal Kombat co-creator John Tobias, Kung Lao's hat was inspired by the 1964 James Bond movie Goldfinger, in which a villain Oddjob threw his special derby hat as a deadly weapon. Kung Lao was portrayed by Anthony Marquez in Mortal Kombat II and Mortal Kombat 3; Ed Boon said Marquez was ”one of the best martial artists we worked with."

Kung Lao can be seen in Mortal Kombat II, Mortal Kombat 3, and Shaolin Monks wearing the Chinese character 武 which means military/wu shu/martial arts. However, when asked about this character, John Tobias stated that it is Chinese for "war".

Kung Lao's attacks are based on wind-type moves. His most notable attack is the Hat Toss, which could be directed in Mortal Kombat II, but could not be directed since Mortal Kombat Gold, until Mortal Kombat  (2011). Many of his Fatalities involve the use of his hat to some extent, such as slicing the body in half and decapitation.

According to Prima Games, Kung Lao is one of the cheapest Mortal Kombat characters, where they observe "He can combo almost any jumping attack into his Dive Kick. He even has multiple projectile attacks, one of which he can aim up or down, meaning you can't reliably crouch under or jump over it. In Mortal Kombat 3, he even had one of the longest dial-a-combos, because his damage clearly wasn't high enough already."

Other media
Kung Lao made several appearances in Malibu's' Mortal Kombat comic series. His story is slightly altered, stating he is an exile in Outworld due to the failure of his ancestor, and the fall of his lineage. During the comics, he shares a very close relation with Kitana. During the Mortal Kombat: Blood & Thunder miniseries he has a minor participation rescuing a near-death Liu Kang after he was stabbed by Kano. In the Battlewave miniseries, he joins with Kitana, Baraka and Sub-Zero in an attempt to overthrow the Emperor Shao Kahn.

He was also featured in his own one-shot issue from Malibu in the summer of 1995. The comic, entitled Rising Son, showed his struggle against Shang Tsung and his shapeshifting mind tricks, using his friends' forms (Kitana, Baraka and Sub-Zero) as well as his ancestor's form to kill him.

Kung Lao was also the centerpiece of Jeff Rovin's novelization of the first Mortal Kombat game, but his description therein completely differed from that of the games. In the novel, he is depicted as being tall, bald save for a queue of long black hair (similar to Goro's), barefoot, and wearing a long white robe.

Kung Lao appears in Mortal Kombat: Legacy as of season 2, portrayed by Mark Dacascos.

Max Huang, a member of the Jackie Chan Stunt Team, portrays Kung Lao in the 2021 Mortal Kombat reboot film. In the reboot, Liu Kang calls him "shī xiōng," (师兄) which means senior male student or an older male student studying under the same master. Although the English subtitles translate this as "cousin," Ludi Lin, who plays Liu Kang, clarifies that the relationship between the two is more of a "found family" one, and that "cousin" can be considered a term of endearment for a close friend, but the two are not, in fact, related by blood.

Kung Lao appears in Mortal Kombat Legends: Battle of the Realms voice by Matthew Yang King. He's one of the new champions of Earth's Warriors to take part in the Tournament. However, while fighting Shao Khan, he throws his Hat at him, but Shao Khan throws it back and it cut Kung Lao in half.

Great Kung Lao
Kung Lao's ancestor, the Great Kung Lao, was raised in the Order of Light, a monastery of Shaolin monks. While he lived happily with his family and friends, he prepared his entire life to fight in the Mortal Kombat tournament. He was trained thoroughly under the monastery’s martial artists, teaching him moves many would think impossible. All of Kung Lao's training made him the monastery’s best fighter. Being the first person from Earthrealm to represent the Order of Light, he would do battle with the evil sorcerer Shang Tsung 500 years before Liu Kang would do the same. Despite Shang Tsung having the advantage of winning nine consecutive Mortal Kombat tournaments, Kung Lao defeated him and became the ageless Grand Champion, saving Earthrealm in the process. While it is common for the victor to take his opponent's life, Kung Lao spared the sorcerer. Fifty years later, he was defeated by the Shokan prince Goro before Shang Tsung returned to take his soul. 

In Kung Lao's Mortal Kombat II ending (non-canonical) for winning the Outworld Tournament, this is said to have finally avenged the Great Kung Lao's death. The ghost of the Great Kung Lao is in this cutscene as his descendant Kung Lao stands against a mountain backdrop. 

In Deception the Great Kung Lao's soul was presumed to have been freed after Shang Tsung was killed by Raiden's failed attempt to destroy the Dragon King Onaga, giving the Shaolin monk peace after more than five centuries of torment. In the good ending of the DLC expansion Mortal Kombat 11: Aftermath, Fire God Liu Kang goes back in time to meet the Great Kung Lao and give him special training for his future battles.

The Great Kung Lao briefly appeared in animated film Mortal Kombat: The Journey Begins during a flashback sequence detailing his battle with Goro and ultimate defeat at the hands of the Shokan warrior.

The Great Kung Lao is mentioned by name in the first Mortal Kombat film. When Liu Kang challenges Shang Tsung to Mortal Kombat, he calls himself a "descendant of Kung Lao."

The Great Kung Lao was featured in the television show Mortal Kombat: Conquest as the main protagonist and was portrayed by Paolo Montalbán. He is the great-great-great-grandfather of Kung Lao and Liu Kang, who follow his teachings. After becoming Grand Champion, the thunder god Raiden tells him that, because he was the last defending warrior of Earthrealm, Lao is now destined to train new warriors to compete against Kahn's forces for the next Mortal Kombat. He initially rejects this responsibility because he desired to marry his girlfriend Jen, despite her father's refusal. While this took place, Shang Tsung, who was now imprisoned in the Cobalt Mines by Shao Kahn after he failed to beat Kung Lao, sought his revenge and sends the undead warrior Scorpion to kill Kung Lao. Scorpion fails to defeat Kung Lao, but manages to kill Jen during the battle. After losing her, Kung Lao commits to training new warriors to defend Earthrealm and fight in Mortal Kombat when the time comes. He is joined by Jen’s bodyguard Siro and by Taja, a thief who (with Raiden's persuasion) saved Kung Lao's life from Jen’s father. Kung Lao is killed by the Shadow Priests along with Taja and Siro in the final episode of Mortal Kombat: Conquest.

In the 2021 film Mortal Kombat, The Great Kung Lao is mentioned by his descendant of the same name and a mural is shown of him beating Shang Tsung.

Reception
Despite being stated as a fan favorite by CNET in 2006, he has been referred to as an "obscure" character by CBS that same year. In 2008, IGN listed him as a character they would like to see as downloadable content for Mortal Kombat vs. DC Universe, noting him to be a fan favorite character and praising his appearance and his decapitating moves made with his hat. In 2010, IGN mistakenly noted Kung Lao as Liu Kang's brother and died early in the film (this character was actually Chan Kang) and said that Liu Kang and Kung Lao make the franchise "at its best" when they join forces. In UGO's 2012 list of the top Mortal Kombat characters, Kung Lao placed fifth.

Much of the reception regarded his Fatality moves and his famous hat. In a CNET review of Shaolin Monks, it was stated that Kung Lao's body-dividing Fatality "simply doesn't get old." This Fatality was the only death move from the Mortal Kombat series added to the "Top 10 Death Moves" segment of the GamesMaster Gore Special episode and was voted at number four with a comment that no such list "will be complete without a death move from Mortal Kombat, but with so many to choose from, we ended up with a split decision." In 2009, GamePro listed Kung Lao's hat as the ninth best piece of headwear in gaming. His "Bunny Beatdown" from the same game was ranked as the 43rd craziest finishing move in the gaming by Complex.com in 2010, while the hat slice was ranked fifth. That same year, Kung Lao's hat slice Fatality ranked as the 35th most gruesome finishing move ever by UGO.com. Mortal Kombat co-creator Ed Boon commented that Kung Lao's MK2011 'buzzsaw-on-the-ground' was "probably the most painful-looking Fatality ever made;" it was included by FHM on their list of nine most brutal Fatalities in the game. In 2012, Cheat Code Central's Shelby Reiches included the "Jewel Splitter" Fatality among the four worst cinematic scenes in games, commenting: "Every time he does this to a male fighter, I can hardly watch. I try not to fight against Kung Lao anymore." That same year, IGN ranked his hat as 79th top weapon in video game history.

References

External links

Fictional Buddhist monks
Fictional Chinese people in video games
Fictional Shaolin kung fu practitioners
Fictional Tang Láng Quán practitioners
Fictional Wing Chun practitioners
Fictional kenpō practitioners
Fictional male martial artists
Fictional martial artists in video games
Fictional pacifists
Fictional slaves in video games
Fictional swordfighters in video games
Male characters in video games
Male video game villains
Mortal Kombat characters
Religious worker characters in video games
Video game antagonists
Video game characters introduced in 1993
Video game characters who can teleport
Video game protagonists
Zombie and revenant characters in video games